The ZF S6-650 is a 6-speed manual transmission manufactured by ZF Friedrichshafen AG.

General Motors used the S6 as RPO ML6.

Gear ratios:

Applications
 2001–2006 Chevrolet Silverado 2500HD and 3500
 2001–2006 GMC Sierra 2500HD and 3500
 1999–2010 Ford Super Duty F-250, F-350, F-450 & F-550 (with diesel engines)
 2002–2010 Ford Super Duty F-250, F-350, F-450 & F-550 (with gas engines)

Significance 
ZF introduced the S6-650 in 1998 on the Ford Super Duty. GM started using the ZF S6-650 in 2001 with some alterations, making this transmission different from the Ford version.

The S6-650 will likely be the last manual transmission GM and Ford will use in their heavy pick ups, due to advancements in automatic transmission technology and low consumer demand for manual transmissions.

Construction
The ZF S6-650 – Heavy Duty 6 speed manual transmission has an aluminium alloy main gear case and tail housing with the bell housing integral to the case. It is built in two-wheel drive and four-wheel drive versions. The model used in the Ford trucks has an internal oil pump to circulate and cool the lubricant, which is uncommon in manual transmissions. The GM versions are not equipped with an oil pump. All gears are synchronized. There is a dual cone synchronizer on 2nd and 3rd gears with an input torque rating of 520 ft-lb.

See also
 List of ZF transmissions

References
 http://www.autoworld.com/news/gmc/zf_s6_650.htm

S6-650
General Motors transmissions